The 1999 Copa Norte was the third edition of a football competition held in Brazil. Featuring 10 clubs, Pará have three vacancies; Acre, Amapá, Amazonas, Maranhão, Piauí, Rondônia and Roraima with one each. 

In the finals, São Raimundo defeated Sampaio Corrêa 3–1 on penalties after tied 2–2 on aggregate to win their first title and earn the right to play in the 1999 Copa CONMEBOL.

Qualified teams

Preliminary round

Bracket
{{8TeamBracket|seeds=n|legs=2|aggregate=score|nowrap=y

| RD1= Quarter-finals
| RD2= Semi-finals
| RD3= Finals

| RD1-team1=  Independente
| RD1-score1-1=3
| RD1-score1-2=0
| RD1-score1-agg=3
| RD1-team2=  Flamengo
| RD1-score2-1=2
| RD1-score2-2=4
| RD1-score2-agg=6

| RD1-team3=  Paysandu
| RD1-score3-1=0
| RD1-score3-2=1
| RD1-score3-agg=1
| RD1-team4=  Sampaio Corrêa
| RD1-score4-1=2
| RD1-score4-2=1
| RD1-score4-agg=3

| RD1-team5=  São Raimundo (p)
| RD1-score5-1=0
| RD1-score5-2=1
| RD1-score5-agg=1 (5)
| RD1-team6=  Baré
| RD1-score6-1=0
| RD1-score6-2=1
| RD1-score6-agg=1 (4)| RD1-team7=  Independência
| RD1-score7-1=1
| RD1-score7-2=2
| RD1-score7-agg=3| RD1-team8=  Cruzeiro| RD1-score8-1=3
| RD1-score8-2=2
| RD1-score8-agg=5| RD2-team1=  Flamengo
| RD2-score1-1=2
| RD2-score1-2=0
| RD2-score1-agg=2| RD2-team2=  Sampaio Corrêa| RD2-score2-1=4
| RD2-score2-2=4
| RD2-score2-agg=8| RD2-team3=  São Raimundo| RD2-score3-1=8
| RD2-score3-2=2
| RD2-score3-agg=10| RD2-team4=  Cruzeiro
| RD2-score4-1=0
| RD2-score4-2=1
| RD2-score4-agg=1| RD3-team1=  Sampaio Corrêa
| RD3-score1-1=0
| RD3-score1-2=2
| RD3-score1-agg=2 (1)| RD3-team2=  São Raimundo (p)
| RD3-score2-1=1
| RD3-score2-2=1
| RD3-score2-agg=2 (3)'}}

FinalsTied 2–2 on aggregate, São Raimundo won on penalties.''

References

Copa Norte
Copa Norte
Copa Norte